Mount Athos is a mountain in the distal part of the eponymous Athos peninsula and site of an important centre of Eastern Orthodox monasticism in northeastern Greece. The mountain along with the respective part of the peninsula have been governed as the monastic community of Mount Athos, an autonomous region within the Hellenic Republic, ecclesiastically under the direct jurisdiction of the Ecumenical Patriarch of Constantinople, while the remainder of the peninsula forms part of the Aristotelis municipality. Mount Athos has been inhabited since ancient times and is known for its long Christian presence and historical monastic traditions, which date back to at least 800 AD during the Byzantine era. Because of its long history of religious importance, the well-preserved agrarian architecture within the monasteries, and the preservation of the flora and fauna around the mountain, Mount Athos was inscribed on the UNESCO World Heritage List in 1988.

In modern Greek, Mount Athos is referred to as Oros Athos, the peninsula as Hersonisos tou Atho, while the designation Agio Oros translating to 'Holy Mountain' is used to denote the autonomous region of Greece governed by the monastic community of Mount Athos. Some languages of Orthodox tradition use names translating to 'Holy Mountain', these include Bulgarian, Macedonian and Serbian (Света Гора, Sveta Gora); and Georgian. However, not all languages spoken in the Eastern Orthodox world use this name: in Russian it is simply called  (meaning "Athos"), while in Romanian it is called "Mount Athos" ( or ).

Geography 

The Athos peninsula, unlike Sithonia and Kassandra, is a geological continuation of the Rhodope Mountains of  northern Greece and Bulgaria.

The surrounding seas, especially at the end of the peninsula, can be dangerous. In ancient Greek history two fleet disasters in the area are recorded: In 492 BC Darius, the king of Persia, lost 300 ships under general Mardonius. In 411 BC the Spartans lost a fleet of 50 ships under the admiral Epicleas.

Mount Athos has an extensive network of footpaths, many of which date back to the Byzantine period. Many are typically not accessible to motor vehicle traffic.

Flora
Much of Mount Athos is covered with mixed broadleaf deciduous and evergreen forests. Black pine (Pinus nigra) forests are found at higher elevations. Sclerophyllous scrub vegetation is also found throughout Mount Athos. Typical forest trees are sweet chestnut (Castanea sativa), holm oak (Quercus ilex), kermes oak (Quercus coccifera), Hungarian oak (Quercus frainetto), oriental plane (Platanus orientalis), black pine (Pinus nigra), and cedar (Calocedrus decurrens). Other common plant species include the strawberry tree (Arbutus unedo and Arbutus andrachne), cypress (Cupressus sempervirens), laurel (Laurus nobilis), lentisk (Pistacia lentiscus), phillyrea (Phillyrea latifolia), wild olive (Olea europea), and heather (Erica spp.). Deciduous trees that are primarily found alongside streams include white willow, laurel, Oriental plane, and alder trees.

Aleppo pine (Pinus halepensis) is more commonly found in the northern part of the peninsula. Broadleaf maquis is found further south. Deciduous broadleaf forest dominated by sweet chestnut lies above the broadleaf maquis zone. There are also mixed forests consisting deciduous oak trees, as well as limes, aspen, hop hornbeam, and maple. Black pine and stinking juniper can be found at higher elevations. Some herbaceous plants with tubers and bulbs include crocus, anemone, cyclamen, and fritillary species.

At least 35 plant species are endemic to Mount Athos, most of which are found in the area of the main summit in the south. Isatis tinctoria ssp. athoa, a woad subspecies, and Viola athois are named after Mount Athos.

Mount Athos is also home to 350 species of mushrooms.

Fauna
Mammals include the grey wolf (Canis lupus), wild boar (Sus scrofa), red fox (Vulpes vulpes), jackal (Canis aureus), European badger (Meles meles), beech marten (Martes foina), stoat (Mustela erminea), weasel (Mustela nivalis vulgaris), European hedgehog (Erinaceus concolor), shrews (Crocidura spp.), and Mediterranean monk seal (Monachus monachus). Other mammal species include roe deer, hares, and red squirrels.

Birds include the black stork (Ciconia nigra), short-toed snake-eagle (Circaetus gallicus), golden eagle (Aquila chrysaetos), lesser kestrel (Falco naumanni), capercaillie (Tetrao urogallus), eagle owl (Bubo bubo), yelkouan shearwater (Puffinus yelkouan), and Audouin's gull (Larus audouinii). Other bird species include swifts, swallows, martins, nightingales, and hoopoes.

History

Antiquity 

In Greek mythology, Athos is the name of one of the Gigantes that challenged the Greek gods during the Gigantomachia. Athos threw a massive rock at Poseidon which fell in the Aegean Sea and became Mount Athos. According to another version of the story, Poseidon used the mountain to bury the defeated giant.

Homer mentions the mountain Athos in the Iliad. Herodotus writes that, during the Persian invasion of Thrace in 492 BC, the fleet of the Persian commander Mardonius was wrecked with losses of 300 ships and 20,000 men, by a strong North wind while attempting to round the coast near Mount Athos. Herodotus mentions the peninsula, then called Akte, telling us that Pelasgians from the island of Lemnos populated it and naming five cities thereon, Sane, Kleonai (Cleonae), Thyssos (Thyssus), Olophyxos (Olophyxus), and Akrothoon (Acrothoum). Strabo also mentions the cities of Dion (Dium) and Akrothoon. Eretria also established colonies on Akte. At least one other city was established in the Classical period: Akanthos (Acanthus). Some of these cities minted their own coins.

The peninsula was on the invasion route of Xerxes I, who spent three years excavating the Xerxes Canal across the isthmus to allow the passage of his invasion fleet in 483 BC. After the death of Alexander the Great, the architect Dinocrates (Deinokrates) proposed carving the entire mountain into a statue of Alexander.

Pliny the Elder stated in 77 AD that the inhabitants of Mount Athos could "live to their four hundredth year" due to the fact that they eat the skin of vipers.

The history of the peninsula during latter ages is shrouded by the lack of historical accounts. Archaeologists have not been able to determine the exact location of the cities reported by Strabo. It is believed that they must have been deserted when Athos' new inhabitants, the monks, started arriving some time before the ninth century AD.

Early Christianity 

According to the Athonite tradition, the Blessed Virgin Mary was sailing accompanied by St John the Evangelist from Joppa to Cyprus to visit Lazarus. When the ship was blown off course to then-pagan Athos, it was forced to anchor near the port of Klement, close to the present monastery of Iviron. The Virgin walked ashore and, overwhelmed by the wonderful and wild natural beauty of the mountain, she blessed it and asked her Son for it to be her garden. A voice was heard saying, "" (Translation: "Let this place be your inheritance and your garden, a paradise and a haven of salvation for those seeking to be saved"). From that moment the mountain was consecrated as the garden of the Mother of God and was out of bounds to all other women.

Historical documents on ancient Mount Athos history are very few. It is certain that monks have been there since the fourth century, and possibly since the third. During Constantine I's reign (324–337) both Christians and followers of traditional Greek religion were living there. During the reign of Julian (361–363), the churches of Mount Athos were destroyed, and Christians hid in the woods and inaccessible places.

Later, during Theodosius I's reign (379–395), the temples of the traditional Greek religion were destroyed. The lexicographer Hesychius of Alexandria states that in the fifth century there was still a temple and a statue of "Zeus Athonite". After the Islamic conquest of Egypt in the seventh century, many Orthodox monks from the Egyptian desert tried to find another calm place; some of them came to the Athos peninsula. An ancient document states that monks "built huts of wood with roofs of straw [...] and by collecting fruit from the wild trees were providing themselves improvised meals."

Byzantine era and onwards

See also 

Sacred mountains
Okinoshima

Notes

References 

 
Christian holy places
Eastern Orthodoxy in Greece
Ecumenical Patriarchate of Constantinople
Landforms of Chalkidiki
Locations in the Iliad
Athos
Eastern Orthodox Christian culture
Subdivisions of Greece
Tourist attractions in Central Macedonia
World Heritage Sites in Greece
Eastern Orthodox pilgrimage sites
Athos
Athos